Jacqueline Silva (born July 17, 1979) is a professional surfer from Florianópolis, Brazil. Her first professional season was 2002, when she finished as runner-up. In 2009 she was ranked tenth in the world and in 2011 she was ranked ninth. Her favorite place to surf is in Portugal.

References

1979 births
World Surf League surfers
Living people
Sportspeople from Florianópolis